Mehdi Khalis (born 6 January 1989) is a professional footballer who plays as a defender for Olympic Safi. Born in England, he represented Morocco internationally at youth levels.

Career
Khalis played for Falkirk in the Scottish First Division in the 2010–11 season. During the 2011–12 season, he played 17 league matches for JA Drancy in the Championnat de France amateur. On 6 June 2012, he signed for newly promoted Ligue 2 club Chamois Niortais. He made eight appearances in total during the 2012–13 campaign. Khalis was subsequently told in the summer of 2013 that he was not part of manager Pascal Gastien's plans, and in September that year he joined Moroccan club FUS Rabat on a free transfer, signing a three-year contract.

Born in Les Lilas, France, Khalis has represented Morocco internationally at under-21 and under-23 levels.

References

External links
 
 
 

1989 births
Living people
People from Les Lilas
Moroccan footballers
Footballers from Seine-Saint-Denis
Association football defenders
Scottish Football League players
Ligue 2 players
Championnat National 2 players
Qatari Second Division players
Botola players
Falkirk F.C. players
JA Drancy players
Chamois Niortais F.C. players
Fath Union Sport players
Muaither SC players
Moroccan expatriate footballers
Moroccan expatriate sportspeople in Scotland
Expatriate footballers in Scotland
Moroccan expatriate sportspeople in Qatar
Expatriate footballers in Qatar